Jakub Brašeň (born 2 May 1989) is a Slovak footballer who notably played as a midfielder for the Fortuna liga club ViOn Zlaté Moravce. Brašeň had retired from professional football in July 2020.

Club statistics

Updated to games played as of 9 December 2017.

References

External links
FK Dukla profile 

1989 births
Living people
Slovak footballers
Slovak expatriate footballers
Association football midfielders
FK Dukla Banská Bystrica players
FC DAC 1904 Dunajská Streda players
FK Senica players
FC ViOn Zlaté Moravce players
Mezőkövesdi SE footballers
Slovak Super Liga players
Nemzeti Bajnokság I players
4. Liga (Slovakia) players
Expatriate footballers in Hungary
Slovak expatriate sportspeople in Hungary
Sportspeople from Banská Bystrica